

Events

January–March 
 January 1 – Sailing through the Sandwich Islands, Otto von Kotzebue discovers New Year Island.
 January 19 – An army of 5,423 soldiers, led by General José de San Martín, starts crossing the Andes from Argentina, to liberate Chile and then Peru.
 January 20 – Ram Mohan Roy and David Hare found Hindu College, Calcutta, offering instructions in Western languages and subjects.
 February 12 – Battle of Chacabuco: The Argentine–Chilean patriotic army defeats the Spanish. 
 March 3
 President James Madison vetoes John C. Calhoun's Bonus Bill.
 The U.S. Congress passes a law to split the Mississippi Territory, after Mississippi drafts a constitution, creating the Alabama Territory, effective in August.
 March 4 – James Monroe is sworn in as the fifth President of the United States.
 March 21 – The flag of the Pernambucan Revolt is publicly blessed by the dean of Recife Cathedral, Brazil.

April–June 
 April 3 – Princess Caraboo appears in Almondsbury in Gloucestershire, England.
 April 15 – 
The American School for the Deaf opens in Hartford, Connecticut.
An earthquake strikes Palermo in the Kingdom of the Two Sicilies.
 April 29 – The Rush–Bagot Treaty is signed.
 May 27 – The General Convention of the Episcopal Church founds the General Theological Seminary, while meeting in New York City.<ref>
James Grant Wilson, The Memorial History of the City of New-York: From Its First Settlement to the Year 1892, Volume IV (New York History Company, 1893) p596</ref>
 June 12 – 
German inventor Karl Drais drives his dandy horse ("Draisine" or Laufmaschine''), the earliest form of bicycle, in Mannheim.
 Tradesman Jeffery Sedwards establishes the Skibbereen Abstinence Society in Ireland, considered the first organisation devoted to teetotalism in Europe. 
 June 22 – King Ferdinand VII of Spain, by royal decree, makes the production and sale of tobacco a legal endeavor in Cuba, thus sparking the birth of the Cuban cigar industry.
 June 25 – A large riot breaks out in Copenhagen Prison; the army is sent to quell it.

July–September 

 July 4 – At Rome, New York, construction on the Erie Canal begins.
 July 4 - 1817 Santiago del Estero earthquake. A 7.0 magnitude earthquake hits Argentina's Santiago del Estero Province.
 August 15 – By act of the U.S. Congress (March 3), the Alabama Territory is created by splitting the Mississippi Territory in half, on the day the Mississippi constitution is drafted, four months before Mississippi became a U.S. state.
 August 22 – The town of Araraquara, Brazil is founded.
 August 23 – An earthquake near the site of the ancient Greek city of Helike results in 65 deaths.
August 26 – The University of Michigan is founded in Detroit, Michigan.
 September 11 – The Great Rebellion of 1817-18 begins in Sri Lanka.

October–December 
 October 9 - Official opening of the University of Ghent
 October 17 – Frigate  is launched in Bombay for the British Royal Navy; she will still be afloat two centuries later.
October 30 - The independent government of Venezuela is established by Simón Bolívar.
 October 31 – Emperor Ninkō accedes to the throne of Japan.
November 3 - The Bank of Montreal opens in Montreal.
 November 5 – Third Anglo-Maratha War breaks out with the Battle of Khadki.
 November 20 – The first Seminole War begins in Florida.
 November 22 – Frédéric Cailliaud discovers the old Roman emerald mines at Sikait, Egypt.
 December 10 – Mississippi is admitted as the 20th U.S. state, formerly the Mississippi Territory.

Date unknown 
 The first cholera pandemic originates in Bengal, reaching Calcutta by September.
 A typhus epidemic occurs in Edinburgh and Glasgow.
 L'Anciente Mutuelle, as predecessor of Axa, a worldwide insurance and financial service is founded in Rouen, France.

Births

January–June 

 January 8 – Sir Theophilus Shepstone, British-born South African statesman (d. 1893)
 January 28 – Francisco de Lersundi y Hormaechea, Spanish noble and politician, Prime Minister of Spain (d. 1874)
 February 17 – Édouard Thilges, 7th Prime Minister of Luxembourg (d. 1904)
 February 18 – Lewis Armistead, American Confederate general (d. 1863)
 February 19 – King William III of the Netherlands (d. 1890)
 February 22 – Carl Wilhelm Borchardt, German mathematician (d. 1880)
 February 24 – Auguste-Alexandre Ducrot, French general (d. 1882)
 March 6 – Princess Clémentine of Orléans, daughter of King Louis Philippe I of France, mother of Tsar Ferdinand I of Bulgaria (d. 1907)
 March 22 – Braxton Bragg, American Confederate general (d. 1876)
 April 1 – Nissen Shonin, Japanese Buddhist priest Honmon Butsuryū-shū, Kyoto city (d. 1890)
 April 15 – Benjamin Jowett, Master of Balliol College, Oxford (d. 1893)
 April 24 – Jean Charles Galissard de Marignac, Swiss chemist (d. 1894)
 May 15 – Debendranath Tagore, Indian philosopher (d. 1905)
 May 19 – Theodor August Heintzman, Canadian piano manufacturer (d. 1899)
 June 30 – Joseph Dalton Hooker, English botanist (d. 1911)

July–December 

 July 6 – Albert von Kölliker, Swiss biologist, zoologist (d. 1905) 
 July 12
Alphonse Lecointe, French general and politician (d. 1890)
Henry David Thoreau, American philosopher (d. 1862)
 July 15 – John Fowler, British civil engineer (d. 1898)
 July 24 – Adolphe, Grand Duke of Luxembourg (d. 1905)
 July 29 – Ivan Aivazovsky, Armenian-Russian painter (d. 1900)
 August 3 – Archduke Albrecht, Duke of Teschen, Austrian general (d. 1895)
 August 4 – Frederick Theodore Frelinghuysen, 29th United States Secretary of State (d. 1885)
 August 14 – Alexander H. Bailey, American politician (d. 1874)
 August 24 – Aleksey Konstantinovich Tolstoy, Russian writer (d. 1875)
 August 25 – Marie-Eugénie de Jésus, French religious (d. 1898)
 September 6
 Helga de la Brache, Swedish con artist (d. 1885)
 Mihail Kogălniceanu, 3rd Prime Minister of Romania (d. 1891)
 September 14 – Theodor Storm, German writer (d. 1888)
 October 10 – Christophorus Buys Ballot, Dutch chemist, meteorologist (d. 1890)
 October 17 – Sir Syed Ahmad Khan (Bahadaur), Indian founder of the Two Nation Theory for a future Pakistan (d. 1898)
 October 30 – Hermann Franz Moritz Kopp, German chemist (d. 1892)
 November 3 – Leonard Jerome, American entrepreneur, grandfather of Sir Winston Churchill (d. 1891)
 November 12 – Bahá'u'lláh, Persian founder of the Bahá'í Faith (d. 1892)
 November 17 – Benjamin Champney, American painter (d. 1907)
 November 30 – Theodor Mommsen, German writer, Nobel Prize laureate (d. 1903)
 December 8 – Christian Emil Krag-Juel-Vind-Frijs, Prime Minister of Denmark (d. 1896)
 December 10 – Alexander Wood (physician), Scottish inventor of the first true hypodermic syringe (d. 1884) 
 December 23 – Warren Felt Evans, American writer (d. 1889)

Date unknown 
 Sophia Wilkens, Swedish social reformer, pioneer in the education of the intellectually disabled (d. 1889)

Deaths

January–June 

 January 1 – Martin Heinrich Klaproth, German chemist who discovered uranium (1789), zirconium (1789), and cerium (1803) (b. 1743)
 January 11 – Timothy Dwight IV, American educator, theologian (b. 1752)
 January 11 – Margherita Dalmet, Venetian dogaressa (b. 1739)
 January 12 – Juan Andrés, Spanish Jesuit (b. 1740)
 January 16 – Alexander J. Dallas, American statesman, financier (b. 1759)
 February 8 – Francis Horner, Scottish politician, economist (b. 1778)
 March 8 – Anna Maria Lenngren, Swedish writer (b. 1754)
 April 2 – Johann Heinrich Jung, German writer (b. 1740)
 April 4 – André Masséna, French marshal (b. 1758)
 April 12 – Charles Messier, French astronomer (b. 1730)
 April 20 – Infante Antonio Pascual of Spain, Spanish prince (b. 1755)
 June 2 – Clotilde Tambroni, Italian philologist, linguist (b. 1758)
 June 4 – George Farragut, American naval officer (b. 1755)
 June 9 – Théroigne de Méricourt, French revolutionary (b. 1762) 
 June 13 
 Richard Lovell Edgeworth, Anglo-Irish, politician writer and inventor (b. 1744)
 Esther de Gélieu, Swiss educator (b. 1757)
 June 18 – Leonard Neale, American Catholic bishop (b. 1746)
 June 20 – Marie-Gabriel-Florent-Auguste de Choiseul-Gouffier, French diplomat (b. 1752)
 June 24 – Thomas McKean, American lawyer, signer of the Declaration of Independence (b. 1734)
 June 30 – Abraham Gottlob Werner, German geologist (b. 1750)

July–December 

 July 14 – Anne Louise Germaine de Staël, French writer (b. 1766)
 July 18 – Jane Austen, English novelist (b. 1775)
 July 19 – John Palmer, Bath architect (b. c. 1738)
 July 24 – Karađorđe Petrović, Serb leader of the First Serbian Uprising against the Ottoman Empire, founder of the Serbian Karađorđević dynasty (b. 1768)
 August 7 – Pierre Samuel du Pont de Nemours, French politician (b. 1739)
 August 10 – Leopold III, Duke of Anhalt-Dessau (b. 1740)
 September 18 – David Hall, American judge (b. 1752)
 October 11 – Gertrudis Bocanegra, Mexican national heroine (b. 1765) 
 October 13 – Julius Caesar Ibbetson, English artist (b. 1759)
 October 15 – Tadeusz Kościuszko, exiled Polish general, nationalist (b. 1746)
 October 16 – Manuel Piar, Venezuelan military leader (b. 1774)
 November 6 – Princess Charlotte of Wales, Heir-presumptive to the British throne (b. 1796)
 November 7 – Jean-André Deluc, Swiss geologist (b. 1727)
 November 11 – Francisco Javier Mina, Spanish military leader (b. 1789) (executed)
 November 14 – Policarpa Salavarrieta, Colombian spy, revolutionary who worked for the independence of Colombia (b. 1795)
 November 30 – Jean-Baptiste-Melchior Hertel de Rouville, Canadian politician (b. 1748)
 December 7 – William Bligh, British admiral (b. 1754)
 December 1 – Justin Heinrich Knecht, German composer, organist and music theorist (b. 1752)
 December 12 – Emperor Tekle Giyorgis I of Ethiopia, (b. c. 1751)
 December 15
 Usman dan Fodio, founder of Sokoto caliphate (b. 1754)
 Federigo Zuccari, astronomer, director of the Astronomical Observatory of Naples (b. 1783)

References